Ionuț Caragea (born April 12, 1975, Constanța, România) is a Romanian writer living in Oradea, România. Romanian literary critics see him as one of the leaders of the 2000 poetic generation (some critics even considered him the undisputed leader of this generation) and one of the most atypical and original writers of today's Romania. He is also known in France, where he has been published several books translated or written directly into French, thus becoming a member of the Société des Poètes Français and a member of the Société des poètes et artistes de France. Academician Giovanni Dotoli, one of the leading personalities of Francophonie, analyzing the volume of poems "Mon amour abyssal", considers that Ionuț Caragea is a poet who honors Romania and European literature. Ionuț Caragea has been awarded three times by the Society of French Poets. The volume "Mon amour abyssal" was awarded the "François-Victor Hugo" prize , the volume "J'habite la maison aux fenêtres fermées" was awarded the "Mompezat" prize , and the volume "Infecté par l'amour" was awarded an honorary diploma . Three other prizes were awarded by the Society of French Poets and Artists. The volume "J'habite la maison aux fenêtres fermées" won second prize in the grand competition "Henri Meillant" and third prize in the grand competition "Jenny Alpha et Noël-Henri Villard", and the volume "Infecté par l'amour" won second prize in the grand competition "Jenny Alpha et Noël-Henri Villard". In 2021, Ionuț Caragea received the "Genius" prize from the Naji Naaman Foundation, an award given only four times between 2002 and 2021 .

Biography
Caragea was born on April 12, 1975, in Constanța. He is a poet, prose writer, literary critic, editor, aphorism-writer, and cultural promoter. He is a member of the Romanian Writers’ Union, the Cluj branch , a co-founder and vice-chairman of the Romanian Writers’ Association of Québec, an honorary member of the Writers’ Society of Neamț County, an honorary member of the Maison Naaman pour Culture Foundation of Lebanon, a member of Elis – the worldwide remarkable Romanians’ Network, an honorary member of the International Association of Paradoxism, a member of the Diversité Artistique Cultural Organization of Montréal , a member of the Poetas del Mundo Cultural Organization of Chile  etc. As a result of his friendship and name relation with Prince Eugen Enea Caraghiaur, in 2008 he was raised to the noble rank of Baron of the Cuman House of Panciu . 
He started his literary career in 2006, with a collection of poems – Delirium Tremens (STEF Publishing House, Iași). His poems, aphorisms, short stories, and critical essays have appeared in various magazines, newspapers, and anthologies in Romania and diaspora. He is one of the twenty authors who were published in Antologia aforismului românesc contemporan/An Anthology of Contemporary Romanian Aphorisms (Genesi Publishing House, Turin, 2013), and one of the twenty-seven authors who were published in Antologia aforismului românesc contemporan/An Anthology of Contemporary Romanian Aphorisms (Digital Unicorn Publishing House, Constanța, 2016). Following the 2012 Naji Naaman International Contest, he was awarded the Creativity Prize for aphorisms from his collection Dicționarul suferinței/A Dictionary of Suffering (Fides Publishing House, Iași, 2008), translated into French by Professor Constantin Frosin, PhD . He is included in Cartea înțelepciunii universale. Maxime și cugetări din literatura universală/A Book of World Wisdom. Maxims and Thoughts from World Literature (eLiteratura Publishing House, Bucharest, 2014). He is also included in Alertă de grad zero în proza scurtă românească actuală/Red Alert in Today's Romanian Short Story Writing (Herg Benet Publishing House, 2012) . He has won several poetry and short story contests. Some of his work has been translated into six languages: English, French, Spanish, Italian, Arabic and Albanian. He was nicknamed "The poet who was born on Google" after the title of his book M-am născut pe Google/I Was Born on Google (STEF Publishing House, Iași, 2007) . In 2012, the English version of his science fiction novel Uezen was published by Wildside Press (US).

In 2003-2011 he lived in Montréal, Canada, where he received the Canadian citizenship (2008). He worked as a sports instructor and professional sportsman, continuing his rugby career which he started in Romania. He is the son of a former star of Romanian rugby, Florin Caragea, who played for Farul Constanța .  Ionuț Caragea played for Parc Olympique and won the Québec province championship three times .

He started writing poetry in his teens but it was in Canada that he discovered his true calling . His first poems were published on April 6, 2006, in "Observatorul," a literary magazine from Toronto, where he was welcomed by the poet George Filip . Then he was promoted by the editor Dumitru Scorțanu, who published his first three books at STEF Publishing House, Iași. On July 16, 2008, he founded, together with the poet Adrian Erbiceanu, The Romanian Writers’ Association of Québec and the ASLRQ Publishing House. As an editor and founder of ASLRQ, in 2009 he compiled, together with Adrian Erbiceanu and Dumitru Scorțanu, the first anthology of Romanian writers from Québec, a very important work for the diaspora. He committed himself to promoting Romanian culture in North America, being webmaster, webdesigner, and literary promoter for the site of the Romanian Writers’ Association of Québec (www.aslrq.ro), and founder of the Prietenii Poeziei/Poetry's Friends Literary Society. 
In February 2012 he returned to Romania and settled in Oradea. In 2014 the eLiteratura Publishing House published his latest collections of poems that were welcomed by the poet Ana Blandiana with a text on the back cover of his Cer fără scări/Stepless Sky. In 2015 he coordinated the 2015 ASLRQ anthology.
He has published more than 40 books (poems, aphorisms, science fiction, critical essays, thoughts on spirituality, memoirs, and anthologies). Romanian literary critics see him as one of the leaders of the 2000 poetic generation (some critics even considered him the undisputed leader of this generation) and one of the most atypical and original writers of today's Romania. The critic Maria-Ana Tupan believes that the poet Ionuț Caragea sometimes reminds one of Marin Sorescu, a great Romanian writer.

Works

Poetry
Delirium Tremens, STEF, Iași, Romania, 2006 (Romanian)
M-am născut pe Google, STEF, Iași, Romania, 2007 (Romanian)
Donator universal, STEF, Iași, Roumanie, 2007 (Romanian)
Omul din cutia neagră, FIDES, Iași, Romania, 2007 (Romanian)
33 bis, FIDES, Iași, Romania, 2008 (Romanian)
Analfabetism literar, FIDES, Iași, Romania, 2008 (Romanian)
Negru Sacerdot, FIDES, Iași, Romania, 2008 (Romanian)
Absența a ceea ce suntem, FIDES, Iași, Romania, 2009 (Romanian)
Poezii de dragoste  - FIDES, Iași, Romania, 2010 (Romanian)
Suflet zilier, FIDES, Iași, Romania, 2009 (Romanian)Guru amnezic, FIDES, Iași, Romania, 2011 (Romanian)Patria la care mă întorc, FIDES, Iași, Romania, 2012 (Romanian)Antologie de Poeme 2006-2012,  FIDES, Iași, Romania, 2013 (Romanian)La suprême émotion, ASLRQ, Montréal, Québec, Canada, 2009 (French)Déconnecté, ELMIS, Iași, Romania, 2009 (French)Ciel sans escalier/Cer fără scări, eLiteratura, Bucharest, Romania, 2014 (Romanian and French).Festina lente, eLiteratura, Bucharest, Romania, 2014 (Romanian and Spanish)În așteptarea păsării, eLiteratura, Bucharest, Romania, 2015 (poetry and quotes)(Romanian)Umbră lucidă, FIDES, Iași, Romania, 2016 (Romanian)Mesaj către ultimul om de pe Pământ, FIDES, Iași, Romania, 2017 (Romanian)Eu la pătrat, FIDES, Iași, Romania, 2017 (poetry and quotes)(Romanian)Cenușa din abis, FIDES, Iași, Romania, 2018 (Romanian)Despletirea viselor, FIDES, Iași, Romania, 2018 (Romanian)Mon amour abyssal, Stellamaris, Brest, France, 2018 (French)Iubirea mea abisală, FIDES, Iași, Romania, 2018 (Romanian)Une étincelle dans le couloir des ombres, Stellamaris, Brest, France, 2019 (French)Je suis né sur Google, Stellamaris, Brest, France, 2019 (French)J’habite la maison aux fenêtres fermées, Stellamaris, Brest, France, 2019 (French)

Science fiction
Snowdon King – Uezen și alte povestiri, FIDES, Iași, Romania, 2010 (Romanian)
Snowdon King – Conștiința lui Uezen, FIDES, Iași, Romania, 2010 (Romanian)
Snowdon King – Echilibrul lumilor, FIDES, Iași, Romania, 2011 (Romanian)
Snowdon King – Uezen, Wildside Press, Rockville, United States, 2012 (English)
Ionuț Caragea – Discipolii zeilor de altădată, eLiteratura, Bucharest, Romania, 2015 (Romanian)

QuotesDicționarul suferinței, FIDES, Iași, Romania, 2008  (Romanian)Dicționarul suferinței II, FIDES, Iași, Romania, 2010 (Romanian)Întreita suferință, FIDES, Iași, Romania, 2011 (Romanian)Delir cu tremurături de gânduri, FIDES, Iași, Romania, 2013 (Romanian)În așteptarea păsării, eLiteratura, Bucharest, Romania, 2015 (poetry and quotes)(Romanian)Eu la pătrat, FIDES, Iași, Romania, 2017 (poetry and quotes)(Romanian)Din spuma valurilor, FIDES, Iași, Romania, 2018 (Romanian)Aphorismes jaillis de l’écume des flots, Stellamaris, Brest, France, 2018 (French)Roua infinitului, Digital Unicorn, Constanța, Romania, 2018 (Romanian)Flori din părul veșniciei, FIDES, Iași, Romania, 2019 (Romanian)

EssaysLiteratura virtuală și Curentul Generației Google, FIDES, Iași, Romania, 2009 (Romanian)Esențe literare, cronici literare 2007-2011, FIDES, Iași, Romania, 2011 (Romanian)

SpiritualityGîndul meu. Cum am devenit Poet, Ed. Fides, col. Spiritus, Iași, Romania, 2011 (Romanian)Ascultă-ți gândul și împlinește-ți visele, Ed. eLiteratura, Bucharest, Romania, 2016 (Romanian)

Literary Prizes
Honorable Mention in the L. Ron Hubbard Writers of the Future Contest, 4th Quarter, 2021, Hollywood, U.S.A., for the short story "Return to Virtuality," published under the pseudonym Snowdon King. 
First prize for the volume "Infectat cu iubire", at the CORONA International Literary Contest, 6th edition, 2021, organized by Traduzioni Talabà, Italy .
Second prize for the poem "Odă poetului fără mască", at the CORONA International Literature Contest, 5th edition, 2020, organized by Traduzioni Talabà, Italy .
Second prize in the Grand Prix "Jenny Alpha et Noël-Henri Villard", organized by the Society of Poets and Artists of France, 2021 .
Genius" prize at the "Naji Naaman" international competition in Lebanon, 2021 (awarded only four times between 2002 and 2021) 
Honorary diploma for the volume of poems "Infecté par l'amour", awarded in Paris by the Society of French Poets, 2020 
Second prize in the Grand Prix "Henri Meillant", organized by the Society of French Poets and Artists, 2020 
Third prize in the Grand Prix "Jenny Alpha et Noël-Henri Villard", organised by the Society of French Poets and Artists, 2020 
Grand Prize at the Titel Constantinescu International Festival of Literary Creation, 2020, for the volume of literary reviews "Esențe literare. Vol. II"
2020 - The Prize Mompezat 2019 (Paris, France)
2019 - The Prize François-Victor Hugo 2018 (Paris, France)
 2018 - The Big Prize "Sapiens Piroboridava" at the International Festival of Aphorism for Romanians everywhere, Tecuci
 2017 - Special Prize "Mihai Pauliuc" at the International Festival of Aphorism for Romanians everywhere, Tecuci 
 2016 - The Prize for Literary Criticism at the International Festival "eCreator", Baia Mare 
 2016 - 2nd prize - Romania over 100 years, Bucharest, Science Fiction 
2012 – Creativity prize - Naji Naaman'', Beyrouth, Lebanon, quotes 
Four prizes at the national short story competitions organized by Helion Club and Helion Magazine in Timisoara

Appreciations in Romania
https://ro.wikipedia.org/wiki/Ionuț_Caragea

International critical acclaim 
 Acad. prof. univ. dr. Giovanni Dotoli on the volume of poems " Mon amour abyssal " in the journal "Revue européenne de recherches sur la poésie", Paris, France, no. 4 of 2018, pp. 250–251
 Acad. prof. univ. dr. Giovanni Dotoli on the volume of poems " Infecté par l'amour " in the magazine " Noria ", Ed. L'Harmattan Paris, France, no. 4 of 2022. Article accessed in Luceafărul magazine and on the Stellamaris publishing house website 
 Acad. prof. univ. dr. Giovanni Dotoli on the volume of aphorisms " Aphorismes jaillis de l'écume des flots " in the magazine "Noria", Ed. L'Harmattan Paris, France, no. 3 of 2021. Article accessed in the magazine Harmonies Culturelles and on the website of the publisher Stellamaris 
 Prof univ. dr. Jean-Paul Gavard-Perret on the volume of aphorisms "Aphorismes jaillis de l'écume des flots" in Le Litteraire magazine in France, no. of 19 December 2018, article "La résurrection des Lazare"
 Prof univ. dr. Jean-Paul Gavard-Perret on the volume of poems "Ciel sans escalier" in Le Litteraire magazine of France, issue of 6 September 2015, article "Nadir latent"
 Prof univ. dr. Jean-Paul Gavard-Perret on the volume of poems "Mon amour abyssal" in the magazine Le Litteraire of France, issue of 13 July 2018, article "Mon amour abyssal"
Prof univ. dr. Jean-Paul Gavard-Perret on the volume of poems "La suprême émotion" in the magazine "Incertain Regard" in France, issue of 25 September 2010, article "PASSAGE DES SEUILS"
 Prof univ. dr. Jean-Paul Gavard-Perret on the volume of poems "J'habite la maison aux fenêtres fermées" in the magazine Le Litteraire of France, issue of 23 September 2019, article "Lire en accordéon"
 Prof univ. dr. Jean-Paul Gavard-Perret on the volume of poems "Une étincelle dans le couloir des ombres" in the magazine Le Litteraire of France, issue of 14 March 2019, article "L'ombre et la lumière"
 Véronique Flabat-Piot about the volume of the poem "J'habite la maison aux fenêtres fermées" in "l'Anthologie de Poésie 2020", Éditions les Poètes Français, Paris, 2020, accessed by ed. Stellamaris

Bibliography 
1500 Scriitori clasici și contemporani, ed. Porțile Orientului, 2010, pag. 86 (Convorbiri literare) 
Dicționarul Scriitorilor Români de azi, ed. Porțile Orientului, 2011, pag. 95 (Convorbiri literare) 
Literatura română. Dicționarul autorilor români contemporani, Alina Kristinka Cătunescu, Ed. ARIAL, Ploiești, 2013, (Oglinda literară), (Agenția de carte) 
Antologia dell`aforisma romeno contemporaneo, Genesi Editrice, Italy, 2012, pag. 35-41 (Ed. Genesi) 
Antologia Singur, 2010, Ed. Grinta, Cluj-Napoca,  (Caiete silvane) 
Antologia Alertă de grad zero în proza scurtă românească actuală, Ed. Herg Benet, 2011, pag. 269,  (Ed. Herg Benet) 
Literatura Virtuală și Curentul Generației Google (Convorbiri literare) 
Antologia Asociației Scriitorilor de Limbă Română din Québec, Montréal, Canada  2009,  (Convorbiri literare, may 2010);(Ed. ASLRQ) 
Antologia Asociației Scriitorilor de Limbă Română din Québec, Montréal, Canada 2015,  (Ziua de Constanța, 27 may 2015);(Ed. ASLRQ) 
 Cartea Înțelepciunii Universale, un dicționar de maxime și aforisme realizat de Nicolae Mareș. Ed. eLiteratura, Bucharest, 2014, 620 pag., (Boema nr. 6, 2015, pag. 27)  
 Ion Pachia-Tatomirescu - Pagini de istorie literară valahă de mâine, vol. 2, ed. Waldpress, 2015 (pag. 337–339)   Banaterra) 
Ion Pachia-Tatomirescu - Pagini de istorie literară valahă de mâine, vol. 3, ed. Waldpress, 2015 (pag. 63–66)   Banaterra 
Mircea Opriță - Alte cronici de familie, editura Limes, 2014,  (Ed. Limes , Cluj-Napoca) 
Antologia aforismului românesc contemporan, editura Digital Unicorn, Constanța, 2016,  
 Andreea C. Petrache - The New Media Aesthetics and Young Bloggers. ASLRQ, nr. 13, 2022

External links
 Adevărul, 13 oct. 2017, "Un poet constănţean a compus o poezie dedicată lui Publius Ovidius Naso: „Când valurile vor mângâia ţărmul/ Vei auzi Tristele şi Ponticele“" 
 Adevărul, 20 nov. 2015, "Un rugbist a devenit cel mai nou membru al filialei Dobrogea a Uniunii Scriitorilor din România" 
 Adevărul, 27 sept. 2014, "Scriitorul constănțean Ionuț Caragea a mai publicat două volume bilingve de poezie" 
Adevărul, 17 May 2009, "Constanta: Poetul care şi-a descoperit vocaţia în Canada" 
Website: https://www.ionutcaragea.ro 
 Interview, Viața Pozitivă,  Romania, April 2015 
 Interview, Clipa, U.S.A., 23 Nov., 2015 
 TV Digi24 Oradea, "Recrutat în Crișana", 12 June 2015  
 TV Digi24 Oradea, "Recrutat în Crișana", 21 October 2015

Source of translation 
This article contains a translation of Ionuț Caragea from ro.Wikipedia.

References

1975 births
Living people
Romanian poets
Romanian rugby union players
RCJ Farul Constanța players
People from Constanța
Romanian essayists
Romanian male poets
Romanian novelists
Romanian male novelists
Male essayists